Luis J. Lauredo (born 1949) is an American diplomat who served as the 15th United States Ambassador to the Organization of American States from 2000 to 2001 and National Coordinator for the 3rd Summit of the Americas held in Quebec City, Canada.

Biography 
Lauredo received his Bachelor of Arts degree from Columbia College, graduating in 1972. He attended the University of Madrid, Spain for graduate studies and Georgetown University Law Center.

Lauredo had an extensive career in public service. He was Senior Vice President of the Export-Import Bank of the United States, Commissioner of the Florida Public Service Commission, City Councilman for the Village of Key Biscayne, Florida, and as the President’s Representative to the Southern States Energy Board. He served as the Executive Director of the 1994 Summit of the Americas in Miami.

Lauredo was appointed on December 22, 1999 for the post of ambassador. At the time of his appointment, he was the President of Greenberg Traurig Consulting Inc., an affiliate of the international law firm Greenberg Traurig, where he specialized in international relations, energy, telecommunications, aviation, and banking issues.

He is a member of the Council of American Ambassadors.

References 

1949 births
Living people
20th-century American diplomats
20th-century American politicians
Columbia College (New York) alumni
Complutense University of Madrid alumni
Georgetown University Law Center alumni
Permanent Representatives of the United States to the Organization of American States